The .44 Smith & Wesson Special, also commonly known as .44 S&W Special, .44 Special, .44 Spl, .44 Spc, or 10.9×29mmR, is a smokeless powder center fire metallic revolver cartridge developed by Smith & Wesson in 1907 as the standard chambering for their New Century revolver, introduced in 1908.

Development
On the late 19th century American frontier, large .44- and .45-caliber cartridges were considered the epitome of handgun ammunition for self-protection, home defense, and hunting. Black-powder rounds such as the .44 American, .44 Russian, .44 Colt, .44-40 Winchester, .45 Schofield, and .45 Colt enjoyed a well-earned reputation for effective terminal ballistics, accuracy, and reliability.

At the start of the 20th century, Smith & Wesson decided to celebrate by introducing a brand new revolver design which they called the New Century.

Smith & Wesson wished to pair their new revolver design with a worthy new ammunition chambering. At the time, smokeless powder was state of the art in ammunition technology. Older black-powder ammunition was in the process of being converted to smokeless. Smith & Wesson's popular .44 Russian cartridge had established a reputation for superb accuracy and was a renowned target load, and they decided to use an improved smokeless powder version as the basis for the new round. Due to the lower energy density of the early semi-smokeless powders, prior efforts to convert the .44 Russian to smokeless had produced less than stellar ballistic performance.

Ballistics
Unfortunately, the ballistics of the new cartridge merely duplicated the  bullet @  statistics of the .44 Russian, when the powder capacity of its case would have supported performance rivaling that of the .45 Colt and close to the .44-40. Nevertheless, the .44 Special retained its progenitor's reputation for accuracy.

The .44 Associates

Almost from its introduction, firearms enthusiasts and cartridge handloaders saw that the potential of the .44 Special chambering was far from being realized and by the end of the 1920s were loading it to much higher velocities than factory standards. Led by articles in firearms periodicals penned by gun writers such as Elmer Keith and Skeeter Skelton, a loose cadre of enthusiastic fans who called themselves the ".44 Associates" formed. Trading information such as .44 Special handloading data and tips regarding the conversion of revolvers to .44 caliber, they promulgated the belief espoused by many firearms authorities and experts that the .44 Special chambering is one of the best overall in the handguns.

Elmer Keith and his Magnums
Elmer Keith, one of the most famous and popular firearms related authors at the time, developed a number of classical heavy handloads for the .44 Special; many are still highly regarded today. He also championed the concept of higher powered big-bore revolvers with Smith & Wesson and Remington Arms, eventually leading to the development of the .357 Magnum, .41 Magnum, and .44 Magnum. Keith's suggested designation for the proposed .44 caliber round was the ".44 Special Magnum," but when Remington Arms developed the cartridge they chose to name it the .44 Remington Magnum. Nonetheless, the new cartridge was developed directly from the .44 Special design by simply lengthening the older case by .125 inch. Remington's stated rationale for the making of this change was to preclude higher pressured Magnum loads from being chambered in .44 Special revolvers.

Usage and loadings

The hype and excitement surrounding the introduction of the .44 Magnum in the mid-1950s eclipsed the .44 Special, causing it to fall in popularity with firearms manufacturers. They offered fewer models chambered for .44 Special for several years. Recently the .44 Special has experienced something of a resurgence, since many firearms enthusiasts have realized that the heavy recoil of the Magnum round is "too much pistol" for many applications, and the heavier and more bulky revolvers chambered for it are not as convenient to carry. Another factor fueling the .44 Special's comeback is its ability to fit in the longer chambers of the .44 Magnum revolvers, much like the .38 Special fits in the longer chambers of the .357 Magnum. This makes the .44 Special cartridge an attractive alternative for reduced velocity target shooting and plinking. The popularity of cowboy action shooting has also helped pique interest in the .44 Special, motivating manufacturers to offer modern and reproduction firearms chambered for this classic cartridge.

Special high performance terminal ballistic loads are also offered, such  as the Hornady JHP, Winchester Silvertip JHP, Speer Gold Dot JHP, Federal LHP, Cor-Bon JHP, and various other jacketed hollow point and soft point designs.

See also
 10 mm caliber
 List of handgun cartridges
 List of rifle cartridges
 Table of handgun and rifle cartridges

References

External links
 Ballistics By The Inch .44 Special results

Pistol and rifle cartridges
Smith & Wesson cartridges